Lanao was a province of the Philippines from 1914 to 1959. Today, the province comprises Lanao del Norte and Lanao del Sur.

History
The term "Lanao" is derived from a Maranao word "Ranao" meaning a body of water. "Meranau" means lake dweller. They are the natives of the place occupying the land around Lake Lanao, which is situated at the central part of Lanao del Sur. Lanao, applies to the entire area before its division. When it was divided into two provinces, the southern portion became Lanao del Sur and the northern part became Lanao del Norte.

Dansalan, Marawi City's old name, was explored by the Spaniards as early as 1639. It is said that at that time, Marawi was already the citadel of Malayan-Arabic culture in Mindanao. Feeling the pulse of strong refusal among its inhabitants to adopt Christianity, the Spaniards abandoned the project of colonizing the area. Dansalan, physically speaking, would have satisfactorily qualified to become a town or municipality during the time of said exploration based on the Spanish Policy of "Ecclesiastical Administration" except for fanatical resistance of the natives who were mostly under Muslim rule.

A strong Spanish expedition to conquer the Maranaos was fielded in 1891 during the time of Governor General Valeriano Weyler, but this force was driven back to Iligan after failing to capture Dansalan. In 1895, Governor General Blanco sent a stronger force to take Marawi that thanks to superior firepower finally overrun the last defenses. The Spanish forces won a decisive victory and were able to erect a garrison in Dansalan and they already took with them Chabacanos and Chabacano-speaking Muslims from Zamboanga and Basilan and Cebuanos. However, they had to abandon it just four years later after the outbreak of the Spanish–American War in 1898, leaving it on the hands of the new American colonizers, who imposed their own rule on the population.

American occupation
On May 24, 1904, the American Colonial Government proclaimed Dansalan a regular Municipality. The Philippines was still under the Commonwealth regime of the Americans when Dansalan was chartered into a city in 1904. In 1914, the Department of Mindanao and Sulu was created and Lanao was converted as a province.

Division

The passage of Republic Act No. 2228 divided Lanao into two (2) provinces giving birth to Lanao del Norte and Lanao del Sur. The new province was inaugurated on July 4, 1959 making Iligan City as the capital of the north and Marawi City for the south. During the establishment process of the Autonomous Region in Muslim Mindanao, Lanao del Sur (and later Marawi City) voted to be part of the new autonomous region, while Lanao del Norte chose to remain in Northern Mindanao.

Timeline

 1 September 1914: Department of Mindanao and Sulu provided with autonomous government through Act No. 2408 enacted on July 23, 1914. Bukidnon sub-province and the former Moro Province districts of Cotabato, Davao, Lanao, Sulu and Zamboanga converted to provinces.
 22 May 1959: Lanao province divided into Lanao del Norte and Lanao del Sur through Republic Act No. 2228. Lanao del Sur retained the provincial capital of Marawi (formerly Dansalan).
 4 October 1971: Meranaw province created from Lanao del Sur through Republic Act No. 6406, remained unorganized due to the disruption caused by the declaration of martial law in the Philippines.
 1975 Province of Sultan Mardan, Lanao del Sur district two nominated by AFP Governor general Mamarinta Lao in Lanao del Sur.

References

See also
 Legislative district of Lanao
 Lanao del Norte
 Lanao del Sur
 Former provinces of the Philippines

Former provinces of the Philippines
States and territories established in 1914
1914 establishments in the Philippines
States and territories disestablished in 1959
1959 disestablishments in the Philippines
History of Lanao del Norte
History of Lanao del Sur